"I Was Made for Dancin'" is a song written by Michael Lloyd and performed by Leif Garrett. It reached #4 on the UK Singles Chart, #10 on the Billboard Hot 100, and #38 on the US adult contemporary chart.  It also reached #2 in Australia, #10 in Germany, and #12 in Japan.  The song, produced by Lloyd and arranged by John D'Andrea, was featured on his 1978 album, Feel the Need.

The single ranked #37 on the Billboard Year-End Hot 100 singles of 1979.

Chart performance

Weekly charts

Year-end charts

Certifications

Cover Versions
Pink Lady released a Japanese version of the song on their 1979 album, We Are Sexy.
Mayo Kawasaki released a Japanese version of the song on his 1979 single, Let's Go Dancing (レッツゴーダンシング). This song is a track of his Golden☆Best (ゴールデン☆ベスト).
Ilona Staller released a version of the song on her 1979 album, Ilona Staller.
Insooni released a Korean version of the song, 춤을 춰요, on her 1981 album, 인연 (Destiny).
Jeremy Jackson released a version of the song on his 1995 album, Always.
Bridgette Wilson released a cover of the song for her 1996 album, Gimme a Kiss.
Queens released a version of the song on their 2006 album, Made for Dancing.

In popular culture
Garrett sang the song on the episode "My Teenage Idol is Missing" on the TV show Wonder Woman.
Garrett's version was featured in the 2001 film Joe Dirt.
Carol Burnett sings a version of this song in season 5, episode 15 of The Muppet Show.

References

1978 songs
1978 singles
1979 singles
Leif Garrett songs
Scotti Brothers Records singles
Songs about dancing
Songs written by Michael Lloyd (music producer)
Song recordings produced by Michael Lloyd